The fourth season of Braxton Family Values, an American reality television series, was broadcast on WE tv. The series aired from August 14, 2014 until November 12, 2015, consisting of 28 episodes. Its executive producers were Toni Braxton, Tamar Braxton, Vincent Herbert, Dan Cutforth, Jane Lipsitz, Julio Kollerbohm, Michelle Kongkasuwan, Lauren Gellert, Annabelle McDonald and Sitarah Pendelton.

Braxton Family Values focuses on the lives of Toni Braxton and her sisters — Tamar, Traci, Towanda, and Trina — plus their mother, Evelyn.

The season received generally favorable reviews from critics and was the most watched season with 1.5 million total viewers, up 8% compared to the previous seasons.

Production
Braxton Family Values was officially renewed for its fourth season on March 20, 2014, announced by WE tv. A teaser trailer was released on July 1, 2014, on WE tv's YouTube channel. 

The season premiered with "Bright Lights, Big Breakdowns" on August 14, 2014. The season went on a seven-month hiatus before returning on May 21, 2015, for its eleventh episode. The twenty-sixth episode "Making Fetch Happen" served as the season finale, airing on September 3, 2015. It was followed by a two-part special "Braxton Family Secrets" that aired on November 5, and November 12, 2015, which marked the conclusion of the season.

Synopsis
As Tamar and Towanda's feud continues to escalate, Towanda gets pushed to her breaking point. The sisters attempt to mend the bond of sisterhood again by going to a therapy retreat but it doesn't take long for Tamar and Traci to bump heads resulting Tamar to leave. The sisters rent a home in L.A. to work on an inspirational album together later deciding on recording a single together as the girls couldn't agree on the direction of the family album. Traci, Towanda and Trina surprise Tamar on stage during her solo tour, while Tamar doesn't react to the idea well the sisters get kicked out of the building leaving the sisters deeply hurt. Evelyn faces major surgery as the sisters rush to Los Angeles to be by her side. Tamar fears she can't be there for the operation. Trina announces she's filing for a divorce from her estranged husband Gabe after appearing in divorce court with Gabe resulting she and her two sons must move out of their home in five days. Traci is anxious about her teenage son's engagement, but she's not ready to tell her family.

Toni wins her seventh Grammy Award for Best R&B Album at the 57th Annual Grammy Awards for her collaborative album "Love, Marriage & Divorce" with Babyface. Trina finds herself wrapped up in a new relationship with her contractor Jacent, the sisters meddle in Trina's love life and invite him to dinner. Tamar invites the sisters to the studio to listen to her new single If I Don't Have You and Toni brings the idea forward to record a Christmas album with the sisters. As the sisters get together in the studio recording tracks for the album, tensions arise with Toni and Traci resulting Traci to leave the recording studio potentially putting the Christmas album in jeopardy.

U.S. television ratings 
The season's premiere episode "Bright Lights, Big Breakdowns" attracted over 1.22 million viewers during its initial broadcast on August 14, 2014, including 0.500 thousand viewers in the 18–49 demographic via Nielsen ratings. It marked as the most watched season premiere of the franchise. The season's most watched episode "Divine Intervention", attracted over 1.30 million viewers during its initial broadcast on July 9, 2015, including 0.600 thousand viewers in the 18–49 demographic via Nielsen ratings.

Episodes

Home media
Despite previous seasons being released to DVD, the series was released digitally to Amazon store in the United States in two volumes — Volume one and Volume two. The season was also released to iTunes into two volumes under the titles as Volume 6 and Volume 7.

References

External links

 
 
 

2014 American television seasons
2015 American television seasons